Rufus Philip Isaacs (June 11, 1914 – January 18, 1981) was a game theorist especially prominent in the 1950s and 1960s with his work on differential games.

Biography
Isaacs was born on 11 June 1914 in New York City. He worked for the RAND Corporation from 1948 until winter 1954/1955. His investigation stemmed from classic pursuit–evasion type zero-sum dynamic two-player games such as the Princess and monster game. In 1942, he married Rose Bicov, and they had two daughters.

His work in pure mathematics included working with monodiffric functions, fractional-order mappings, graph theory, analytic functions, and number theory. In graph theory he constructed the first two infinite families of snarks. In applied mathematics, he worked with aerodynamics, elasticity, optimization, and differential games, which he is most known for. He received his bachelor's degree from MIT in 1936, and received his MA and PhD from Columbia University in 1942 and 1943 respectively. His first post after the war ended was at Notre Dame, but he left in 1947 due to salary issues. While at RAND, much of his work was classified, and thus remained unknown until the publication of his classic text on differential games a decade after leaving RAND. His career after RAND was spent largely in the defense and avionics industries. While at RAND, he worked with researchers including Richard E. Bellman, Leonard D. Berkovitz, David H. Blackwell, John M. Danskin, Melvin Dresher, Wendell H. Fleming, Irving L. Glicksberg, Oliver A. Gross, Samuel Karlin, John W. Milnor, John F. Nash, and Lloyd S. Shapley. His work has significant influence on mathematical optimization including fundamental concepts such as dynamic programming (Richard E. Bellman) and the Pontryagin maximum principle (Breitner 2005) which are widely used in economics and many other fields.

Isaacs was a professor of Mathematical Sciences and Electrical Engineering at the Johns Hopkins University between 1967 and his retirement in 1977.

Selected work(s)
Isaacs, Rufus. Differential Games, John Wiley and Sons, 1965.

The Isaacs Award
The executive board of the International Society of Dynamic Games decided in 2003 to establish a prize to recognize the "outstanding contribution to the theory and applications of dynamic games" of two scholars at each of its symposium, starting in 2004. The prize was named after Isaacs.

The recipients of this prize are: 
 Yu-Chi Ho and George Leitmann (2004)
 Nikolay Krasovskii and Wendell Fleming (2006)
  and Alain Haurie (2008)
 Steffen Jørgensen and Karl Sigmund (2012)
 Eitan Altman and Leon Petrosyan (2014)
 Martino Bardi and Ross Cressman (2016)
 Andrzej Nowak and Georges Zaccour (2018)

See also
Pursuit–evasion games
Princess and Monster game
Search games

Notes

References
Yu, P. L. "An appreciation of professor Rufus Isaacs" Journal of Optimization Theory and Applications, Springer Netherlands. Volume 27, Number 1 / January, 1979
Breitner, M. H. "The Genesis of Differential Games in Light of Isaacs' Contributions". Journal of Optimization Theory and Applications, Springer Netherlands. Volume 124, Number 3 / March, 2005

1914 births
Massachusetts Institute of Technology School of Science alumni
Columbia University alumni
University of Notre Dame faculty
Game theorists
Control theorists
1981 deaths
20th-century American mathematicians